The 2014–15 Davidson Wildcats women's basketball team represented Davidson College during the 2014–15 college basketball season. Michele Savage resumed the responsibility as head coach for a fifth consecutive season. The Wildcats were new members of the Atlantic 10 Conference and play their home games at the John M. Belk Arena. They finished the season 5–25, 1–15 in A-10 play to finish in last place. They lost in the first round of the A-10 women's tournament to La Salle.

2014–15 media

Davidson Wildcats Sports Network
Select Wildcats games were broadcast on Teamline with Derek Smith and Leslie Urban hosting and commenting. Most home games were also featured on the A-10 Digital Network. Select games were televised.

Roster

Schedule

|-
!colspan=9 style="background:#970213; color:#FFFFFF;"| Exhibition

|-
!colspan=9 style="background:#FFFFFF; color:#970213;"| Regular Season

|-
!colspan=9 style="background:#970213; color:#FFFFFF;"| Atlantic 10 Tournament

Rankings
2014–15 NCAA Division I women's basketball rankings

See also
 2014–15 Davidson Wildcats men's basketball team
 Davidson Wildcats women's basketball

References

Davidson Wildcats women's basketball seasons
Davidson
2014 in North Carolina
2015 in sports in North Carolina